Colleville may refer to:

 Colleville, Seine-Maritime, Normandy, France
 Colleville-sur-Mer in Calvados, Normandy, France
 Colleville-Montgomery in Calvados, Normandy, France

See also
 Coleville (disambiguation)
 Colville (disambiguation)
 Anne-Hyacinthe de Colleville (1761–1824), French novelist and dramatist